Iqbalpur was one of the 70 constituencies of the Uttarakhand Legislative Assembly in Uttarakhand state of north India. It was abolished in 2012 following the delimitation.
It was a part of Haridwar (Lok Sabha constituency).

Members of Legislative Assembly

See also
 Piran Kaliyar (Uttarakhand Assembly constituency)

References

Former assembly constituencies of Uttarakhand
2002 establishments in Uttarakhand
Constituencies established in 2002